Luigi P. Carnesecca (born January 5, 1925) is an American retired college basketball coach at St. John's University. Carnesecca also coached at the professional level, leading the New York Nets of the American Basketball Association for three seasons. Carnesecca was elected to the Naismith Memorial Basketball Hall of Fame in 1992.

He coached the St. John's basketball program to 526 wins and 200 losses over 24 seasons (1965–70, 1973–92). The colorful "Looie" (as he was popularly known by fans and by the media) reached the post-season in every season he coached the team, including a Final Four appearance in 1985. He was selected as the National Coach of the Year in 1983 and 1985 by the U.S. Basketball Writers Association.

Carnesecca is widely known for his sense of humor and his signature sweaters. In November 2004, St. John's University officially dedicated and renamed the historic Alumni Hall to Carnesecca Arena.

Early life and education
Carnesecca attended high school at St. Ann's Academy in Manhattan (now academic and athletic powerhouse Archbishop Molloy High School). Upon graduation, he served for three years in the US Coast Guard during World War II, where he served on a troop transport in the Pacific theater.

Basketball career
Upon discharge from the Coast Guard, he then enrolled at St. John's and graduated in 1950. He also coached his high school alma mater, St. Ann's, where he was succeeded by Jack Curran.

After beginning his coaching career at St. John's in 1965, Carnesecca jumped to the pro level. He was head coach and general manager of the American Basketball Association's New York Nets for three seasons from 1970 to 1973. The ballclub qualified for the postseason in each of the three campaigns with Carnesecca at the helm. The 1971–72 Nets finished third in the regular season but reached the ABA Finals where they were defeated by the Indiana Pacers in six games. Despite the loss of Rick Barry and a 30–53 record, the Nets edged out the Memphis Tams for fourth place and the final playoff berth in the Eastern Division in 1972–73. 

Carnesecca announced his return to St. John's on March 27, 1973. He replaced Frank Mulzoff, his successor from three years earlier who had resigned after a 19–7 campaign. He had two years out of a total of five remaining on his Nets contract in which he was to have received about $200,000 spread over seven years. His $22,000 salary at St. John's meant that he took a financial loss in the transition. He explained, "I've had my whack at pro ball and I'm very happy with it. But when the opportunity arose to return to St. John's, I wanted to go back."

Carnesecca was also a longtime announcer for the USA Network's coverage of the yearly NBA drafts of the 1980s.

Head coaching record

High school

College

ABA

|-
| align="left" |NYN
| align="left" |1971
|84||40||44||.476|| align="center" |3rd in Eastern||6||2||4||.333
| align="center" |Lost in ABA Division semifinals
|-
| align="left" |NYN
| align="left" |1972
|84||44||40||.524|| align="center" |3rd in Eastern||19||10||9||.526
| align="center" |Lost in ABA Finals
|-
| align="left" |NYN
| align="left" |1973
|84||30||54||.357|| align="center" |4th in Eastern||5||1||4||.200
| align="center" |Lost in ABA Division semifinals
|-class="sortbottom"
| align="left" |Career
| ||252||114||138||.452|| ||30||13||17||.433

See also
 List of NCAA Division I men's basketball tournament Final Four appearances by coach

References

External links
 

1925 births
Living people
American people of Italian descent
Basketball coaches from New York (state)
High school basketball coaches in New York (state)
Naismith Memorial Basketball Hall of Fame inductees
National Basketball Association broadcasters
National Collegiate Basketball Hall of Fame inductees
New York Nets head coaches
Sportspeople from New York City
St. Ann's Academy (Manhattan) alumni
St. John's Red Storm baseball coaches
St. John's Red Storm baseball players
St. John's Red Storm men's basketball coaches
United States Coast Guard enlisted
United States Coast Guard personnel of World War II